Cryobacterium luteum is a Gram-positive and rod-shaped  bacterium from the genus Cryobacterium which has been isolated from glacier ice from a glacier from the Xinjiang Uyghur Autonomous Region in China.

References

Microbacteriaceae
Bacteria described in 2012